The women's lightweight (−62 kilograms) event at the 2010 Asian Games took place on 19 November 2010 at Guangdong Gymnasium, Guangzhou, China.

A total of twelve competitors from twelve countries competed in this event, limited to fighters whose body weight was less than 62 kilograms. 

Noh Eun-sil of South Korea won the gold medal after beating Raheleh Asemani of Iran in gold medal match 14–2, The bronze medal was shared by Dhunyanun Premwaew of Thailand and Chang Chiung-fang from Chinese Taipei.

The bronze medalist Dhunyanun Premwaew had participated in two previous editions and won two silver medals under her former name Chonnapas Premwaew.

Schedule
All times are China Standard Time (UTC+08:00)

Results

References

Results

External links
Official website

Taekwondo at the 2010 Asian Games